Themba Ndlovu is a Zimbabwean professional footballer, who plays as a defender for Dynamos F.C.

International career
In January 2014, coach Ian Gorowa, invited him to be a part of the Zimbabwe squad for the 2014 African Nations Championship. He helped the team to a fourth-place finish after being defeated by Nigeria by a goal to nil.

References

External links

Living people
Zimbabwean footballers
Zimbabwe A' international footballers
2014 African Nations Championship players
1984 births
Association football defenders
Zimbabwe international footballers